Acir Marcos Gurgacz (born February 5, 1962) is a Brazilian politician and journalist. He has represented Rondônia in the Federal Senate since 2009. He is a member of the Democratic Labour Party.

References

Living people
1962 births
Brazilian people of Polish descent
Members of the Federal Senate (Brazil)
Democratic Labour Party (Brazil) politicians
People from Cascavel